Henri Leconte won the singles title of the 1988 Swatch Open tennis tournament by defeating Jérôme Potier 6–2, 6–2 in the final. It was the 7th title for Leconte on his career and the first one since 1986, when he won his last two titles at Geneva and Hamburg.

Seeds

Draw

Finals

Top half

Bottom half

References

External links
 Official results archive (ATP)
 Official results archive (ITF)

1988 Singles